The 2009–10 Arkansas Razorbacks men's basketball team represented the University of Arkansas in the 2009–10 college basketball season. The head coach was John Pelphrey, serving in his third year. The team played its home games at Bud Walton Arena in Fayetteville, Arkansas and are members of the Southeastern Conference. They finished the season 14–18, 7–9 in SEC play and lost in the first round of the 2010 SEC men's basketball tournament.

2009–10 Roster
It was announced on July 5 that Jason Henry would not return to the hardwood for the Razorbacks this fall.

2009–10 schedule and results
Retrieved from arkansasrazorbacks.com

|-
!colspan=12 style="background:#; color:#FFFFFF;"| Exhibition

|-
!colspan=12 style="background:#; color:#FFFFFF;"| Regular Season

|-
!colspan=12 style="background:#C41E3A;"| SEC Tournament

Awards and honors

Stephen Cox
SEC Winter Academic Honor Roll
Rotnei Clarke
Number one shooter in the country – Foxsports.com
SEC Community Service team
United States Basketball Writer's Association's 2009–10 All-District VII team
Courtney Fortson
SEC Player of the Week  – Southeastern Conference
SEC All-Conference second team – SEC Coaches
All-SEC Honorable Mention – Associated Press
Marshawn Powell
SEC Freshman of the Week  – Southeastern Conference
SEC All-Freshman team – SEC Coaches
SEC All-Freshman team – TSN
Freshman All-American – Rivals.com

References

External links
Arkansas Razorbacks men's basketball official website

Arkansas
Arkansas Razorbacks men's basketball seasons
Razor
Razor